Thomas James Griffin (January 25, 1913 – September 1984) was a British boxer who competed in the 1936 Summer Olympics.

In 1936 he was eliminated in the quarterfinals of the light heavyweight class after losing his fight to eventual bronze medalist Francisco Risiglione.

External links
 profile
 profile on boxrec

1913 births
1984 deaths
Light-heavyweight boxers
Olympic boxers of Great Britain
Boxers at the 1936 Summer Olympics
British male boxers